The United Provinces of British India, more commonly known as the United Provinces, was a province of British India, which came into existence on 3 January 1921 as a result of the renaming of the United Provinces of Agra and Oudh.  It corresponded approximately to the combined regions of the present-day Indian states of Uttar Pradesh and Uttarakhand.  It ceased to exist on 1 April 1937 when it was renamed as the United Provinces. Lucknow became its capital some time after 1921. Nainital was the summer capital of the province.

Administrative divisions
The United Provinces of British India included 9 divisions with 48 districts:

 Meerut Division
 Meerut District
 Dehra Dun District
 Saharanpur District
 Muzaffarnagar District
 Bulandshahr District
 Aligarh District
 Agra Division
 Muttra District (Mathura)
 Agra District
 Farrukhabad District
 Mainpuri District
 Etawah District
 Etah District
 Rohilkhand Division
 Bijnaur District (Bijnor)
 Moradabad District
 Budaun District
 Bareilly District
 Shahjahanpur District
 Pilibhit District
 Allahabad Division 
 Cawnpore District (Kanpur) 
 Fatehpur District
 Allahabad District
 Jhansi Division
 Banda District
 Hamirpur District
 Jhansi District
 Jalaun District
 Benares Division
 Mirzapur District
 Benares District
 Jaunpur District
 Ghazipur District
 Ballia District
 Gorakhpur Division
 Azamgarh District
 Gorakhpur District
 Basti District
 Kumaun Division
 Almora District
 Naini Tal District
 Garhwal District
 Lucknow Division
 Lucknow District
 Unao District (Unnao)
 Rae Bareli District
 Hardoi District
 Sitapur District
 Kheri District
 Faizabad Division
 Faizabad District
 Bahraich District
 Gonda District
 Sultanpur District 
 Bara Banki District
 Partabgarh District

Princely states
Rampur State 
Tehri-Garhwal State

Dyarchy (1920–37)
The Government of India Act 1919 expanded the United Provinces Legislative Council to 123 seats, including more elected Indian members. The reforms also introduced the principle of diarchy, whereby certain responsibilities such as agriculture, health, education, and local government, were transferred to elected ministers. However, the important portfolios like finance, police and irrigation were reserved with members of the Governor's Executive Council. Some of the prominent members and ministers in the United Provinces were Mohammad Ali Mohammad Khan (Home Member), C. Y. Chintamani (Minister of Education and Industries) and Jagat Narain Mulla (Minister of Local & Self Government).

See also 
 List of governors of the United Provinces of British India

References 

1921 establishments in British India
1937 disestablishments in British India
Provinces of British India
British administration in Uttar Pradesh